The Musical Theatre Karlín (Czech: Hudební divadlo Karlín) is a theatre in the Karlín district of Prague devoted largely to the performance of operettas and musical theatre. Built in 1881, it is now the second largest theatre in Prague after the Prague State Opera.

Sources
 History of Musical Theatre Karlín – official web site

External links

 Official website
 TACE – entry in  TACE database

Music venues in Prague
Theatres in Prague
1881 establishments in Austria-Hungary
Theatres completed in 1881
Music venues completed in 1881